Latin omega, or simply omega, is an additional letter of the Latin alphabet, based on the lowercase of the Greek letter omega . It was included as a Latin letter in the Mann and Dalby 1982 revision of the African reference alphabet and has been used as such in some publications in Kulango languages in Côte d'Ivoire in the 1990s. In other Kulango publications the letters V with hook  or Latin upsilon  are found instead.
The Italian humanist Giovan Giωrgio Trissino proposed in 1524 a reform of Italian orthography that included lowercase and uppercase omega for the open  sound.
He later re-assigned it to the closed .

Encoding 
Latin omega was released in Unicode 8.0.

See also 
Ω ω : Greek letter Omega
Ѡ ѡ : Cyrillic letter Omega

Bibliography 

 Pascal Boyeldieu, Stefan Elders, Gudrun Miehe. 2008. Grammaire koulango (parler de Bouna, Côte d’Ivoire). Köln: Rüdiger Köppe. 
 Diocèse de Bondoukou Nassian. 1992. Syllabaire koulango : réservé aux élèves des cours bibliques en Koulango (Inspiré par les syllabaires de la Société Internationale de Linguistique, collection: « Je lis ma langue », Nouvelles Éditions Africaines / EDICEF). Nassian: Diocèse de Bondoukou.
 Mann, Michael and David Dalby. 1987. A thesaurus of African languages: A classified and annotated inventory of the spoken languages of Africa with an appendix on their written representation. London: Hans Zell Publishers.
 Michael Everson, Denis Jacquerye, Chris Lilley. Proposal for the addition of ten Latin characters to the UCS. ISO/IEC JTC1/SC2/WG2, Document N4297, 2012-07-26.
 Henry Frieland Buckner. A Grammar of Maskωke, or Creek Language, Marion, Alabama, 1860.

Latin-script letters